Several ships of the Swedish Navy have been named HSwMS Neptun, after the Roman god of freshwater and the sea:

 , a  launched in 1942 and decommissioned in 1966.
 , a  launched in 1978 and decommissioned in 1998. Now a museum ship.

See also

Swedish Navy ship names